Famlje is a village in the Municipality of Divača in the Littoral region of Slovenia.

Church

The local church is dedicated to Saint Thomas and belongs to the Parish of Vreme.

References

External links 

Famlje on Geopedia

Populated places in the Municipality of Divača